The Biechele Soap Company was a leading business in 19th-century Canton, Ohio. It was created by Charles and Joseph Biechele, part of the successful Biechele Brothers. 

Charles, Joseph, Leopold and Gustavus Biechele were born in Endingen am Kaiserstuhl, a small town in southwestern Germany. They immigrated to the United States in the mid-19th century, where Charles began to experiment with soap recipes. When the demand for his soap began on a small scale in 1858, he started a manufacturing plant. His brother Joseph soon joined the business, which continued to grow.

Charles started a separate grocery business and left the soap business in Joseph's care. Biechele Soap soon became a national brand, and, at its height, competed with other leading soap manufacturers in Chicago, Philadelphia, Buffalo and Cincinnati.

Joseph became a friend of Ohio governor, and eventual twenty-fifth president of The United States, William McKinley. He attended McKinley's wedding to Ida Saxton, and was a pallbearer at McKinley's funeral when McKinley was assassinated.

In 1913, Joseph Biechele sold his recipes to what is now known as Hygienic Products Co. He died in 1916 at the age of 80.

References 
Historical Collections of Ohio: An Encyclopedia of the State- by Henry Howe (1891)

External links
Biechele Soap Biography
A Biechele Soap postcard at Ivory Project

Soap brands
1858 introductions